NFL GameDay 2001 is a video game developed and published by 989 Sports and Sony Computer Entertainment America for the PlayStation and the PlayStation 2 in 2000. On the cover is Marshall Faulk.

Reception

The game received "mixed or average reviews" on both platforms according to the review aggregation website Metacritic, though the PlayStation version was better received than the PlayStation 2 version. Bill Donohue of NextGen said of the former, "This game deserves a spot in your sports line-up, but everyone we know wants the PS2 version. Is this the end of the line for the PlayStation GameDay series?" Rob Smolka of the same magazine later changed his tune and said of the latter, "Even if all of the abundant flaws were to magically disappear, GameDay 2001 still wouldn't hold up against Madden 2001, which is much better-looking, has better control, features a lot more options, and, most importantly, is actually a finished product."

The PS2 version was a runner-up for GameSpots annual "Most Disappointing Game" award among console games, which ultimately went to Shenmue. The staff called the former "lackluster" and noted that Sony was "well known for producing superior sports games".

Notes

References

External links
 

2000 video games
NFL GameDay video games
North America-exclusive video games
PlayStation (console) games
PlayStation 2 games
Video games developed in the United States